11 Train may refer to:
 Paris Métro Line 11
 Line 11, Shanghai Metro

See also
 Line 11 (disambiguation)